Fraunberg is a municipality in the district of Erding in Bavaria in Germany.

Notable people 
 Emil Lang, Luftwaffe flying ace

References 

Erding (district)